Horacio Antonio "Rabbit" Martínez Estrella (October 20, 1912 – April 14, 1992), nicknamed "Rabbit", was a baseball player in the Negro leagues. Primarily a shortstop and second baseman, he played for the New York Cubans from 1935 to 1936 and 1940 to 1947.

References
Negro League Baseball Museum

External links
 and Seamheads
 Horacio Martinez at SABR Biography Project

1912 births
1992 deaths
Leopardos de Santa Clara players
New York Cubans players
Sportspeople from Santo Domingo
Expatriate baseball players in Cuba
Dominican Republic expatriate baseball players in the United States
Baseball infielders